Obenchain Mountain is a summit in the U.S. state of Oregon.

Obenchain Mountain was named in 1864 after One John Obenchain.

References

Mountains of Jackson County, Oregon
Mountains of Oregon